Probable ATP-dependent RNA helicase DDX56 is an enzyme that in humans is encoded by the DDX56 gene.

This gene encodes a member of the DEAD box protein family. DEAD box proteins, characterized by the conserved motif Asp-Glu-Ala-Asp (DEAD), are putative RNA helicases. They are implicated in a number of cellular processes involving alteration of RNA secondary structure such as translation initiation, nuclear and mitochondrial splicing, and ribosome and spliceosome assembly. Based on their distribution patterns, some members of this family are believed to be involved in embryogenesis, spermatogenesis, and cellular growth and division. The protein encoded by this gene shows ATPase activity in the presence of polynucleotides and associates with nucleoplasmic 65S preribosomal particles. This gene may be involved in ribosome synthesis, most likely during assembly of the large 60S ribosomal subunit.

References

Further reading